Mohammed Allal Sinaceur (born 1941) is a Moroccan philosopher, politician and writer. He was the Moroccan Minister of Cultural Affairs.

Biography
Sinaceur was born in Oujda, Morocco in 1941. He is a member of a well connected Moroccan family. His brother Mohamed Habib Sinaceur, a politician, died in 2000. One of his brothers is a General and another, Jamal Eddine Sinaceur, is a diplomat. He was the Moroccan Minister for Cultural Affairs in 1994.

He writes on philosophy and Islamic issues for UNESCO and some of his works have been translated into over 30 languages. He is called to expert meetings on Education.

Works
He has been writing since at least 1977.

His works include
 Aristote aujourd'hui : études réunies ... à l'occasion du 2300e anniversaire de la mort du philosophe, 1988 in French
 Cours de philosophie positive, with Auguste Comte, Ed, 1998 in French
 The Hassan II mosque, with Philippe Ploqui

References

Living people
People from Oujda
UNESCO officials
1941 births
20th-century Moroccan philosophers
Government ministers of Morocco
Moroccan  officials of the United Nations
Moroccan politicians
Moroccan civil servants
Member of the Academy of the Kingdom of Morocco